Alarik Frithiof Holmgren (October 22, 1831 – August 14, 1897) was a Swedish physician, physiologist and professor at Upsala University, most noted for his research of color blindness. He was a vocal opponent of vivisection, and particularly the use of curare to immobilize subjects so they appeared peaceful while enduring great pain.

Biography
Holmgren was born in Östergötland, Sweden. From 1852 he served as a medial practitioner including during the cholera pandemic in Norrköping and Söderköping. He graduated as a Medical Doctor from Uppsala University in 1861. He joined the faculty of Uppsala University and in 1864, was appointed professor of physiology. He researched color blindness and his most notable work was about color blindness in relation to rail and sea transport. His research took him to London, Berlin, Vienna and Paris.  He devised a standardized test for color blindness in 1874. Following a railway crash at Lagerlunda in 1875, he advocated the need to preclude people with defective color vision from railway employment.  This established the now standard practice of excluded color blind individuals from employment in certain sectors.

Personal life
Holmgren was a member of the Royal Swedish Academy of Sciences from 1880.  In 1869, he was married to the suffragist Ann-Margret Holmgren  (1850–1940). They were the parents of eight children. Both he and his wife were buried at Uppsala old cemetery.

See also 
 History of animal testing

References

External links 
 
Holmgren's (1877) De la cécité des couleurs dans ses rapports avec les chemins de fer et la marine - digital facsimile at the Linda Hall Library

1831 births
1897 deaths
Anti-vivisectionists
People from Östergötland
Uppsala University alumni
Academic staff of Uppsala University
19th-century Swedish physicians
Swedish physiologists
Swedish medical researchers
Members of the Royal Swedish Academy of Sciences
Burials at Uppsala old cemetery